The Vijay Special Jury Award is given by STAR Vijay as part of its annual Vijay Awards ceremony for Tamil (Kollywood) films. The award is given to both actors and films.

Actors

Films

See also
 Tamil cinema
 Cinema of India

References

Special Jury Award